Kay Armatage (born 1943) is a Canadian filmmaker, former programmer at the Toronto International Film Festival and Professor emerita at the University of Toronto's Cinema Studies Institute and Women & Gender Studies Institute. Though she attained a B.A. in English Literature from Queen's University, her name is generally linked with the University of Toronto.

Hailing from Saskatchewan, Armatage now lives in Toronto, Ontario. During her time as an international programmer at TIFF, Armatage worked hard to introduce audiences to female filmmakers and showed an affinity for risk-taking films. This tendency plays out in her films; Armatage makes feminist pieces that realist and experimental in form, usually documentaries. As a feminist filmmaker, Armatage makes observational films that speak to women's issues and challenges conventional filmmaking.

Career 
Kay Armatage was an international programmer for the Toronto International Film Festival from 1982 to 2004, participating in a total of 23 TIFF’s. She has been praised for sticking up for Catherine Breillat’s Fat Girl (2001) when the board wanted to cut many scenes from the film for the festival in the name of censorship. Armatage has often argued for gender equality in filmmaking, and has stated that she believes that the goal for female filmmakers shouldn't just be to get to the halfway point, but to potentially exceed it.  Armatage is now on the Board of Directors of Women in View - an advocacy group for gender and diversity in Canadian media.

Kay Armatage is also a professor emerita at the Cinema Studies Institute and the Women and Gender Studies Institute at the University of Toronto. She has written a large body of scholarly work, including well known pieces such as The Girl From God’s Country: Nell Shipman and Silent Cinema and co-edited Gendering the Nation: Canadian Women’s Cinema. Through her academic writing, Armatage has said she hopes to help close the huge gap in writing about feminist filmmaking.

Filmmaking 
As a filmmaker, Armatage is known for her queer-friendly documentaries that approach ‘women’s issues’ – according to Cameron Bailey's writing on Armatage's film Artist on Fire (1987). Armatage's films have broached subjects such as "abortion in Speakbody (1979), objectification and economy in Striptease (1980) - from a grounding in theory" and challenge other straight documentary conventions. Her films also attempt to uphold the principles of feminist filmmaking through "flexibility of roles, collaboration and equality of participation," according to Armatage's own writing. Her first two short films, Jill Johnston: October 1975 (co-dir. Lydia Wazana, 1977) and Gertrude and Alice in Passing (1978) are recognized as some of the first Canadian indie films to point to the political relevance of lesbian history and culture. Striptease (1980) has been commended for its validation of sex industry workers by respecting their subject-generated performances.

Armatage's films have been shown in art galleries and film festivals, such as the Art Gallery of Ontario and the Chicago, Toronto and Edinburgh film festivals. Her film Artist on Fire (1987) received a special citation for excellence in documentary filmmaking from the jury for the Toronto International Film Festival Award for Best Canadian Film at the 1987 Toronto International Film Festival.

Jill Johnston: October 1975 (co-dir. Lydia Wazana, 1977) 
Kay Armatage's first film was a short, which she directed alongside Lydia Wazana. The film is a documentary, which follows American author of Lesbian Nation and cultural critic Jill Johnston during one week of interviews in Toronto. The film's first showing at the University of Toronto's Innis College 'town hall'  would become a marked day in Armatage's career. Following the audience's applause after the end of the short film, Jill Johnston (the film's subject) stood onstage to announce that there was a conflict of interest between herself and the filmmakers. She disagreed with how the film portrayed her, and claimed that she could not relate to the film and believed that the image it created would 'harm' her aspirations as a serious writer. As a result, Johnston refused to sign a release for its distribution outside of Canada.

Filmography

References

Further reading 

 Armatage, K. (2003). The Girl from God's Country: Nell Shipman and the Silent Cinema. University of Toronto Press. 
 Armatage, K., Banning, K., Longfellow, B., & Marchessault, J. (Eds.). (1999). Gendering the Nation: Canadian Women's Cinema. University of Toronto Press.

Archival sources 

 Kay Armatage fond at Library and Archives Canada. The archival reference number is R8319.

External links 
 
Kay Armatage archival papers held at University of Toronto Archives and Records Management Services

1943 births
Living people
Canadian documentary film directors
Canadian women film directors
Film directors from Saskatchewan
Film directors from Toronto
Canadian women documentary filmmakers
Toronto International Film Festival people